Lizaveta Piatrenka (born 21 April 2002) is an Belarusian visually impaired Paralympic athlete specializing in javelin throw. She represented Belarus at the 2020 Summer Paralympics.

Career
Piatrenka represented Belarus in the javelin throw F13 event at the 2020 Summer Paralympics and won a bronze medal.

References 

2002 births
Living people
People from Mogilev
Paralympic athletes of Belarus
Medalists at the World Para Athletics European Championships
Athletes (track and field) at the 2020 Summer Paralympics
Medalists at the 2020 Summer Paralympics
Paralympic bronze medalists for Belarus
Paralympic medalists in athletics (track and field)
Belarusian female javelin throwers
Sportspeople from Mogilev Region